The Siberian elm cultivar Ulmus pumila 'Dropmore'  was grown from seed collected by F. L. Skinner, of Dropmore, Manitoba, in Harbin, China.

Description
'Dropmore' is a fast-growing bushy form producing small leaves.

Pests and diseases
See under Ulmus pumila.

Cultivation
The tree remains in commercial cultivation in the United States. Considered cold-hardy far into Canada , it did not perform well in the hot, arid, climate of Arizona as part of the elm trials in conducted by the Northern Arizona University at Holbrook.

Accessions
North America
Dominion Arboretum, Ottawa, Ontario, Canada. No acc. details.
Morton Arboretum, US. Acc. no. 883–85
University of Wisconsin–Madison Arboretum, US. Acc. details not known
Europe
Grange Farm Arboretum, Lincolnshire, UK. Acc. no. 1273.

Nurseries
North America
Lincoln Oakes , Bismarck, North Dakota, US.

References

Siberian elm cultivar
Ulmus articles with images